P&O Banking Corporation, was a bank established in 1920, by Peninsular and Oriental Steam Navigation Company to develop its private banking business.

Seven years later (in 1927) the Chartered Bank of India, Australia and China (now Standard Chartered Bank), acquired P&O Bank and its businesses were amalgamated to the global operations of Chartered Bank.

History
In 1920 James Mackay, later the Earl of Inchcape, of the Peninsular and Oriental Steam Navigation Company, established the P&O Banking Corporation to develop the shipping company's private banking business.

Its Director was Sir Alexander Kemp Wright also of the RBS.

Inchacape incorporated the bank on 3 May 1920 with an issued capital of £2m. Shareholders included  Lloyds Bank and National Provincial Bank. P&O Bank opened for business in London in June, the following month, and simultaneously at Calcutta, Bombay and Madras. More branches overseas followed. In 1920 P&O Bank established a branch in Colombo, Ceylon, which it followed by establishing branches in Shanghai, Hong Kong, Singapore, and Canton.

In 1920 it also acquired Allahabad Bank (est. 1865) in India. However, P&O Bank ran Allahabad Bank separately.

However, P&O Bank was unable to wean the customers of the shipping business away from their existing banking relationships. In a search of income it ended up booking riskier business, with the result that it was plagued with bad debts.

In 1927 Chartered Bank of India, Australia and China (now Standard Chartered Bank) acquired 75% of P&O Bank and later acquired the remaining shares, P&O Bank never having established a viable banking business. For a while, Chartered continued to run the two banks, P&O and Allahabad, separately. In 1937 Chartered merged in P&O Bank, but not Allahabad; the government of India nationalized Allahabad on 19 July 1969.

When Chartered closed the branch in Colombo, the Bank of Ceylon was able to take on almost the entire staff.

Citations and references
Citations

References
 
 

P&O (company)
Standard Chartered
Banks established in 1920
British overseas banks
1920 establishments in England
Banks disestablished in 1927
1927 disestablishments in England
British companies disestablished in 1927
British companies established in 1920